Vivian Frederick Rowe (18 February 1901 – September 1967) was an English amateur footballer who played in the Football League for Brentford as an inside forward.

Personal life 
Rowe was the uncle of table tennis sisters Rosalind and Diane Rowe. His younger brother, Ronald, was also an amateur footballer.

Career statistics

References

1901 births
English footballers
English Football League players
Brentford F.C. players
1967 deaths
Footballers from Lambeth
Association football inside forwards
Dulwich Hamlet F.C. players
Wimbledon F.C. players
Isthmian League players
Hendon F.C. players